Posedarje is a municipality in Zadar County of Croatia with 3,607 inhabitants (2011 census).

References

Municipalities of Croatia
Populated places in Zadar County